The following is a list of notable events and releases that happened in 2013 in music in the United States.

Notable events

January
8 – American Alternative Rock duo Twenty One Pilots released their third and major-label debut album Vessel after signing with Fueled by Ramen.
9 – Original Three Days Grace lead singer Adam Gontier leaves the band, citing health concerns
10 – Six and a half years after releasing FutureSex/LoveSounds, Justin Timberlake announces his return to music with a new album titled The 20/20 Experience, and a summer tour with Jay-Z.

February
3 – Alicia Keys performed the National Anthem and Beyoncé performed during the halftime show at Super Bowl XLVII.
4 – Fall Out Boy announced their reformation with a new album and concert tour.
10 — The 55th Annual Grammy Awards took place at the Staples Center in Los Angeles, hosted by LL Cool J. Dan Auerbach wins the most awards of the night with five. Mumford and Sons win Album of the Year with Babel, while Gotye's "Somebody That I Used to Know", featuring Kimbra, wins Record of the Year.
17 – Country singer Mindy McCready commits suicide at the age of 37
27 – Stone Temple Pilots fire their lead singer, Scott Weiland

March
15 – Justin Timberlake's album, The 20/20 Experience, was released selling 968,000 copies in its first week. It became the best-selling album of the year in the U.S.
22 – My Chemical Romance break up after twelve years together. They end up reuniting six years later.

April
2 – Bon Jovi member Richie Sambora announced his departure from the band just hours before a concert date scheduled in Calgary, Alberta
7 - The Academy of Country Music Awards took place at the MGM Grand Garden Arena in Las Vegas.
New Kids on the Block released their first album in five years, 10
12 – Fall Out Boy released their first album in a little over four years, Save Rock and Roll.
14 – Founding Deftones bassist Chi Cheng passes away at age 42 after spending more than 4 years in a coma as a result of a 2008 car accident
21 – Divinyls singer Chrissy Amphlett dies from breast cancer at the age of 53

May
2 – Slayer guitarist Jeff Hanneman dies from cirrhosis of the liver at age 49
16 – Candice Glover is crowned winner of American Idol (season 12) while Kree Harrison is named runner-up
18 – Chester Bennington of Linkin Park fame plays his first show as the singer for Stone Temple Pilots; also STP's first concert since original singer Scott Weiland was terminated
19 — The Billboard Music Awards took place at the MGM Grand Garden Arena in Las Vegas. Taylor Swift took home the most awards of the night with eight including Top Artist.
20 – The Doors keyboardist Ray Manzarek dies in Germany from bile duct cancer at age 74
22 – Thirty Seconds to Mars released their first studio album in four years, Love, Lust, Faith and Dreams.

June
18 — Cher make a historic return after eleven years of absence with "Woman's World", the lead single of her twenty-fifth studio album Closer to the Truth which is released three months later.
 Danielle Bradbery wins the fourth season of The Voice. Michelle Chamuel is named runner-up. The Swon Brothers finishing third place.
25 — Stone Gossard released his first solo album in twelve years, Moonlander

July
4 – Jay Z released his first solo studio album in four years, Magna Carta Holy Grail, which sold over 550,000 copies in its first week.
30 – The Backstreet Boys released their first studio album in four years, In a World Like This. This is their first album with Kevin Richardson since Never Gone (2005).

August
25 — The 2013 MTV Video Music Awards were held at the Barclays Center in Brooklyn. Justin Timberlake was awarded the Michael Jackson Video Vanguard Award, also performing a 15-minutes medley including a reunion with NSYNC, the first time in nine years. Miley Cyrus creates controversy by twerking at Robin Thicke's crotch area, during a performance.
Katy Perry released her lead single "Roar" for her fourth studio album, Prism. The song reached number 1 and sold 9.9 million copies around the world.
30 — Nine Inch Nails released their first studio album in five years, Hesitation Marks.

September
20 – Cher released her first studio album in twelve years, Closer to the Truth, debuting at number three on the Billboard 200 (making it Cher's first highest-peaking solo album on the chart).

October
8 – Stone Temple Pilots released their High Rise EP, their only release to feature Linkin Park singer Chester Bennington on lead vocals.
14 – The Dismemberment Plan released their first album in twelve years, Uncanney Valley.
27 – Lou Reed, founding member of Velvet Underground, dies in Southampton, New York from liver disease at age 71.
29 – The teen pop rock band Jonas Brothers announced an indefinite hiatus following many disagreements. They announced a return in 2019.

November
5 – Eminem's album, The Marshall Mathers LP 2, was released selling 792,000 copies in its first week, and was the second-best-selling album of the year in the U.S.
6 — The CMA Awards took place at the Bridgestone Arena in Nashville, Tennessee.
19 — Reggie and the Full Effect released their first album in five years, No Country for Old Musicians
24 — The American Music Awards took place at the Nokia Theatre L.A. Live.

December
6 — Master P released his first studio album in twelve years, The Gift.
13 – Beyoncé released her surprise fifth studio album, Beyoncé, a 'visual album' containing 14 songs and an accompanying music video for each song. The album debuts at #1 based on 3 days of digital sales, making Beyoncé the first female artist, and second artist overall to debut at the top spot with her first five studio efforts.
17 – Tessanne Chin wins the fifth season of The Voice. Jacquie Lee is named runner-up. Will Champlin finishing third place.

Bands formed

 Beach Slang
 Big Data
 Bully
 Childbirth
 Fight or Flight
 G.R.L.
 I Prevail
 Julian Casablancas+The Voidz
 Pup
 Rae Sremmurd
 Royal Blood
 Run the Jewels
 Starbomb
 Sylvan Esso

Bands reformed

Black Flag
The Calling
Danity Kane
Failure
The Fall of Troy
Fall Out Boy
Medicine
Neutral Milk Hotel
Nine Inch Nails
The Postal Service
Rocket from the Crypt
Story of the Year
TLC

Bands on hiatus
Ben Folds Five
Bloc Party
Evanescence
Ghostland Observatory
Lifehouse
Mumford & Sons
The Walkmen

Bands disbanded

A Life Once Lost
A Tribe Called Quest
Allstar Weekend
A Rocket to the Moon
Asobi Seksu
Attack Attack!
Azari & III
Bloodhound Gang
The Calling
The Chariot
Charlie Brown Jr.
Churchill
The Click Five
Comadre
Dr. Acula
E for Explosion
Friends
Gifts From Enola
Girls Aloud
Go Radio
God Forbid
Great Big Sea
Honor Society
Jonas Brothers
Kid Dynamite
Klymaxx
Lostprophets
Madina Lake
The Mars Volta
My Chemical Romance
New Boyz
The Postal Service
S.C.U.M
Sharks
Static-X
Sunny Day Real Estate
Supercute!
Swedish House Mafia
Tribes
Underoath
Weapon
Wild Flag
Woe, Is Me

Albums released

January

February

March

April

May

June

July

August

September

October

November

December

Top songs on record

Billboard Hot 100 No. 1 Songs
"Blurred Lines" – Robin Thicke feat. T.I. and Pharrell (12 weeks)
"Can't Hold Us" – Macklemore and Ryan Lewis feat. Ray Dalton (5 weeks) 
"Harlem Shake" – Baauer (5 weeks)
"Just Give Me a Reason" – Pink feat. Nate Ruess (3 weeks)
"Locked Out of Heaven" – Bruno Mars (4 weeks in 2013, 2 weeks in 2012)
"Roar" – Katy Perry (2 weeks)
"Royals" – Lorde (9 weeks)
"The Monster" – Eminem feat. Rihanna (2 weeks in 2013, 2 weeks in 2014)
"Thrift Shop" – Macklemore and Ryan Lewis feat. Wanz (6 weeks)
"When I Was Your Man" – Bruno Mars (1 week)
"Wrecking Ball" – Miley Cyrus (3 weeks)

Billboard Hot 100 Top 20 Hits
All songs that reached the Top 20 on the Billboard Hot 100 chart during the year, complete with peak chart placement.

Deaths

See also
 2010s in music
 2013 in American television
 List of 2013 albums

References